Predrag Balašević (born 5 January 1974 in Podgorac) is a Serbian politician of Timok Vlach ethnicity who is currently the leader of the Vlach National Party.

Biography
Balašević created the Vlach National Party on 25 April 2004 in Bor to defend the rights of Timok Vlachs of Serbia. In 2008, he led the political coalition United Vlachs of Serbia formed between the Vlach National Party and two other Vlach parties. This was done with the intention of participating in the 2008 Serbian parliamentary election. For doing this, 10,516 signatures showing support to the coalition were submitted. The coalition presented 171 candidates in the elections.

Balašević has reported that the lack of education in the Romanian language in the Timok Valley is "dramatic" and endangers the survival of the community, demanding help from Romania and comparing the situation with the support that Hungary brings to its diaspora. On 2020, he participated in the 2020 Serbian parliamentary election, saying that this election was an important opportunity for a representative of the estimated around 330,000-strong Romanian minority in Serbia to enter the Parliament of Serbia for the first time. Balašević also thanked George Simion and his Romanian party Alliance for the Union of Romanians (AUR) for supporting him during the elections, with AUR being the only party from Romania that did this.

References

1974 births
Living people
Vlachs of Serbia
Serbian people of Romanian descent
Ethnic Romanian politicians in Serbia
Serbian human rights activists